LaTonya M. Goffney is the superintendent of the Aldine Independent School District (AISD), which serves nearly 70,000 students in North Houston and is one of the largest school districts in the state of Texas. She previously served as superintendent of the Lufkin Independent School District and the Coldspring-Oakhurst Consolidated Independent School District.

Education 
Dr. Goffney earned a bachelor’s degree in history, a master’s degree in educational administration from Sam Houston State University, completing her doctorate in educational leadership at the same institution in 2011.

Career 
Dr. Goffney began her career in 1999 as a middle school language arts teacher in Coldspring-Oakhurst Consolidated Independent School District, the rural district near Sam Houston National Forest where she completed high school. She was named superintendent in 2008, and served in that position until 2013. A global education professional association, PDK International, named Dr. Goffney an Emerging Leader in 2012.

In 2013, Dr. Goffney became the superintendent of Lufkin Independent School District and she held that position until 2018. She was named Superintendent of the Year by the Texas Association of School Boards in 2017, the first Black woman to receive the award since it was first given in 1984. She was also the 2018 Texas nominee for the American Association of School Administrators National Superintendent of the Year award. Dr. Goffney joined Aldine ISD as superintendent in 2018, the first Black person to hold that position, serving the most students among female superintendents in Texas. In 2019, she was awarded the Sam Houston State University Distinguished Alumni Award, named VYPE Magazine Administrator of the Year, and a finalist for the American Association of School Administrators (AASA) Women In School Leadership Award.

In addition to her work as a district leader, Dr. Goffney is involved with many professional and community organizations. In 2020, she joined the Board of Directors for the Greater Houston Partnership, which serves over 1,100 member companies spread among twelve counties in the Houston area. She is a member of the Texas and National Alliances of Black School Educators, Texas Academic Decathlon Board, TASA Future-Ready Superintendents, Chiefs for Change, Alpha Kappa Alpha sorority, and the Texas Council of Women School Executives.

References 

School superintendents in Texas
Aldine Independent School District
Sam Houston State University alumni
Living people
Alpha Kappa Alpha members
Year of birth missing (living people)